A special law is a type of legislation.

Belgium

A special law, or qualified majority law, is a type of legislation in Belgium which requires a qualified majority in both chambers of the bicameral Belgian Federal Parliament to be adopted, amended or repealed. The Belgian Constitution determines which laws require a qualified or special majority. Special laws are primarily used in institutional matters and in matters concerning the competences of the communities and regions of Belgium. One of the best known examples is the Special Law of 8 August 1980 on the Reform of the Institutions.

A special law must be adopted by both the Chamber of Representatives and the Senate in accordance with Article 4, last paragraph, of the Belgian Constitution, which provides that a special law requires a majority of votes cast in both the Dutch-speaking and the French-speaking language group, on the condition that an absolute majority of the members of each language group is present, and the total number of votes in favour in both language groups must constitute a supermajority of two-thirds of the total number of votes cast.

Canada
In Canada, in the event of strike action(s) and/or lockouts, federal or provincial governments can enact "Back-to-work legislation", a special law, which blocks the strike action and/or lockout from continuing.  It can also impose binding arbitration or a new contract on the disputing parties.  Such legislation was enacted during the 2011 Canada Post strike and the 2012 CP Rail strike, thus effectively ending these strikes as legal actions.  On the provincial level, similar acts can be passed for other purposes; the National Assembly of Quebec enacted Act 78 in 2012 in order to quell a series of student protests.

Spain
The concept of organic law is similar to the Belgian case.

Sweden
The law stating how the Parliament functions can only be changed by a qualified majority.

Belgian legislation
Canadian legislation
Law of Spain
Law of Sweden